Gatton Park is a country estate set in parkland landscaped by Capability Brown at Gatton, near Reigate in Surrey, England.

Now owned by The Royal Alexandra and Albert School, Gatton Park comprises  of manor and parkland. The property is Grade II listed and is in part administered by the National Trust. The park is Grade II listed on the Register of Historic Parks and Gardens.

Most of the park is closed to the public, but there are occasional open days.

History
The manor's history can be traced to the Domesday Book of 1086.
The manor of Gatton had the privilege granted in 1451 of sending two members to Parliament, a privilege it retained, as a "rotten borough", until the Parliamentary reform of 1832. During the medieval period the manor demesne was enclosed as a deer park.

In the 17th century, the house is mentioned as being in the possession of John Weston of Sutton Place, Surrey, the second and eldest surviving son of Sir Richard III Weston) and his wife, Mary Copley (daughter and heiress of William Copley of Gatton) until 1654.

About 1748 Sir James Colebrooke acquired Gatton Park from William Newland, with the proprietorship of the borough of Gatton, and his brother Sir George Colebrooke had the park landscaped by Capability Brown between 1762 and 1768.

In 1789 Thomas Kingscote went to live at Gatton Park after his friend, Robert Ladbroke, had bought it in the same year. It was a notorious pocket borough and Thomas went there in order to manage the election of Ladbroke's nominees. Ladbroke bought it from the Graham family.

In 1830, Gatton was purchased by Frederick John Monson, 5th Baron Monson (1809–1841), for £100,000, for the ancient privilege of sending two members to the House of Commons, a perquisite that was cancelled two years later, "and all Lord Monson had for £100,000 was the land". He set about remaking Gatton Hall splendid: for him Thomas Hopper made alterations to Gatton, but further plans were not executed. The marble hall at the centre of the main block was revetted in marble, even to the inlaid marbles of its floor, taking as a general model the Corsini Chapel in San Giovanni in Laterano, though Lord Monson did not cap his hall with a dome. The walls were frescoed by Joseph Severn with the Four Classical Virtues, embodied by historical ladies.

In 1841 the estate was inherited by the 6th Baron Monson who lived in Lincolnshire and who let Gatton, first to his aunt and then to Hugh Cairns, 1st Earl Cairns, the Attorney General.

The estate was purchased in 1888 by Sir Jeremiah Colman whose family had established the Colman's mustard food brand in the early 19th century. The property was requisitioned during the Second World War; the estate was then purchased by the current owners, The Royal Alexandra and Albert School.

St Andrew's Church

Near the Hall stands the 13th-century church of St Andrew, a Grade I listed building. The church, essentially a chapel for the hall that is reached from the house by a covered walkway, was richly improved within its simple exterior with imported woodwork in 1834: the pulpit and altar, bought from Nuremberg, were optimistically attributed at the time to Albrecht Dürer; the carved doors came from Rouen; the presbytery stalls from a disestablished monastery in Ghent, the altar rails came from Tongeren; stained glass for the windows, and the wainscoting of the nave and carved canopies came from Aarschot, near Leuven.

The Gothic screen at the West end came from an unidentified English church, where it had been dismantled and was about to be burnt. "Gatton, rebuilt in the 1830s, is a bijou" reported Nikolaus Pevsner "perhaps the best example in the country of the tendency for the church to become an extension of the landlord's parlour or sculpture gallery." In 1930, stones from the structure were removed by Sir Jeremiah Colman and the contemporary rector of Gatton and given to Colorado College of Colorado Springs, Colorado in the United States to be incorporated into the structure of the Eugene Percy Shove Memorial Chapel in honor of the donor's ancestor, Edward Shove, who was rector of Gatton from 1615 to 1646.

Other features of the park

Also in the Park stands a wooden small square ornamental garden temple with six Tuscan columns, a Grade II* listed building. Known ironically as Gatton Town Hall, it is the place where, prior to 1832, the tiny electorate of the Gatton rotten borough voted in their two members of Parliament. Behind the "Town Hall" is a stone urn with serpents entwined on a deep moulded plinth inscribed "in memory of the deceased Borough".

During the 1860s Colman commissioned Henry Ernest Milner to design the parterre.

In the park, and accessible from the public footpath, is a stone circle called The Millennium Stones created by the sculptor Richard Kindersley to mark the double millennium in 2000. It is made from flat Caithness flagstones quarried in the far north of Scotland near Thurso. The first stone in the series is inscribed with the words from St John's Gospel, "in the beginning the word was". The other nine stones are carved with quotations contemporary with each 200 year segment of the 2000 year period, ending with the words of T.S. Eliot: "At the still point of the turning world. Neither flesh nor fleshless; Neither from nor towards; at the still point, there the dance is, But neither arrest nor movement."

Notes

External links

the Royal Alexandra and Albert School
Gatton Park Education website
Gatton Park at GreatBritishGardens.co.uk
Gatton Park at VisitSurreyHills.com
Gatton Hall, Redhill

Gardens in Surrey
Country houses in Surrey
National Trust properties in Surrey
Grade II listed buildings in Surrey
Stone circles in England
Gardens by Capability Brown
Grade II listed parks and gardens in Surrey
Lakes of Surrey